Alexei Nikolayevich Kosygin (– 18 December 1980) was a Soviet statesman during the Cold War. He served as the Premier of the Soviet Union from 1964 to 1980 and was one of the most influential Soviet policymakers in the mid-1960s along with General Secretary Leonid Brezhnev.

Kosygin was born in the city of Saint Petersburg in 1904 to a Russian working-class family. He was conscripted into the labour army during the Russian Civil War, and after the Red Army's demobilization in 1921, he worked in Siberia as an industrial manager. Kosygin returned to Leningrad in the early 1930s and worked his way up the Soviet hierarchy. During the Great Patriotic War (World War II), Kosygin was a member of the State Defence Committee and was tasked with moving Soviet industry out of territories soon to be overrun by the German Army. He served as Minister of Finance for a year before becoming Minister of Light Industry (later, Minister of Light Industry and Food). Stalin removed Kosygin from the Politburo one year before his own death in 1953, intentionally weakening Kosygin's position within the Soviet hierarchy.

Stalin died in 1953, and on 20 March 1959, Kosygin was appointed to the position of chairman of the State Planning Committee (Gosplan), a post he would hold for little more than a year. Kosygin next became First Deputy chairman of the Council of Ministers. When Nikita Khrushchev was removed from power in 1964, Kosygin and Leonid Brezhnev succeeded him as Premier and First Secretary, respectively. Thereafter, Kosygin formed a troika alongside Brezhnev and Nikolai Podgorny, the Chairman of the Presidium of the Supreme Soviet, that governed the Soviet Union in Khrushchev's place.

During the early years of the post-Khrushchev troika, Kosygin initially emerged as the most influential figure in Soviet policymaking. In addition to managing the Soviet Union's economy, he assumed a preeminent role in its foreign policy by leading arms control talks with the US and overseeing relations with other communist countries. However, the onset of the Prague Spring in 1968 sparked a severe backlash against his policies, enabling Brezhnev to eclipse him as the dominant force in the Politburo. While he and Brezhnev disliked one another, he remained in office until being forced to retire on 23 October 1980, due to bad health. He died two months later on 18 December 1980.

Early life and career (1904–1964)
Kosygin was born into a Russian working-class family consisting of his father and mother (Nikolai Ilyich and Matrona Alexandrovna) and his siblings. The family lived in Saint Petersburg. Kosygin was baptized (7 March 1904) one month after his birth. He lost his mother in infancy and was brought up by his father.

He and his father sympathized with the Revolution and Alexei was conscripted into a labour army on the Bolshevik side at the age of 14 during the Russian Civil War of 1917–1922. After demobilization from the Red Army in 1921, Kosygin attended the Leningrad Co-operative Technical School and found work in the system of consumer co-operatives in Novosibirsk, Siberia. When asked why he worked in the co-operative sector of the economy, Kosygin replied, quoting a slogan of Vladimir Lenin: "Co-operation – the path to socialism!" Kosygin stayed there for six years until Robert Eikhe personally advised him to quit, shortly before the repressions hit the Soviet consumer co-operation movement.

Pre-war period 
After finishing his studies, Kosygin worked as a foreman and later a manager in a textile mill director. He rose rapidly during the Great Purge, overseen in Leningrad by the provincial communist party boss, Andrei Zhdanov. He was appointed director of the October Textile Factory in 1937, head of the Industry and Transport department of the Leningrad provincial communist party in July 1938, and in October 1938, Chairman of the Executive Committee of the Leningrad City Soviets of Working People's Deputies, ie 'mayor' of Leningrad City. In 1939, he was appointed People's Commissar for Textile and Industry and earned a seat on the Central Committee (CC). In 1940 Kosygin became a Deputy Chairman of the Council of People's Commissars.

Wartime 
Kosygin was appointed by the State Defence Committee to manage critically important missions during the Great Patriotic War (World War II).

As deputy chairman of the Council of Evacuation, he had the task of evacuating industry from territories about to be overrun by the Axis. Under his command 1523 factories were evacuated eastwards, as well as huge volumes of raw materials, ready-made goods and equipment. Kosygin managed clearing of congestions on the railroads in order to maintain their stable operation.

During the Leningrad Blockade he was sent to his hometown to manage the construction of an ice road and a pipeline across the Lake Ladoga. This allowed to evacuate some half-million people from the besieged and starving city, and to supply fuel to its factories and power plants. He was also responsible for the procurement of locally available firewood.

In 1943 Alexey Kosygin was promoted to Chairman of the Council of People's Commissars (government) of the Russian SFSR. In 1944 he was appointed to head the Currency Board of the Soviet Union.

Afterwar period 
Kosygin became a candidate member of the Politburo in 1946. During the Soviet famine of 1946–47 He headed the foodstuff relief missions to the most suffering regions. He was appointed USSR Minister for Finance in February 1948, and a full member of the Politburo on 4 September 1948, putting him among the dozen or so most ranking officials in the USSR.

Kosygin's administrative skills led Stalin to take the younger man under his wing. Stalin shared information with Kosygin, such as how much money the families of Vyacheslav Molotov, Anastas Mikoyan, and Lazar Kaganovich possessed, spent and paid their staff. (A Politburo member earned a modest salary by Soviet standards but enjoyed unlimited access to consumer goods.) Stalin sent Kosygin to each home to put their houses into "proper order".

Temporary fall 
Kosygin's patron, Zhdanov, died suddenly in August 1948. Soon afterwards, Zhdanov's old rivals Lavrentiy Beria and Georgy Malenkov persuaded Stalin to let them remove members of the decapitated Zhdanov faction, of whom the three most prominent were Nikolai Voznesensky, then Chairman of the State Planning Committee and a First Deputy Premier, Alexey Kuznetsov, the party secretary with oversight over the security, and Kosygin. During the brutal purge that followed, known as the Leningrad affair, Voznesensky, Kuznetsov and many others were arrested and shot. Kosygin was relegated to the post of USSR Minister for Light Industry, while nominally retaining his membership of the Politburo until 1952.  Nikita Khrushchev wrote in his memoirs:

Kosygin told his son-in-law Mikhail Gvishiani, an NKVD officer, of the accusations leveled against Voznesensky because of his possession of firearms. Gvishiani and Kosygin threw all their weapons into a lake and searched both their own houses for any listening devices. They found one at Kosygin's house, but it might have been installed to spy on Marshal Georgy Zhukov, who had lived there before him. According to his memoirs, Kosygin never left his home without reminding his wife what to do if he did not return from work. After living two years in constant fear, the family reached the conclusion that Stalin would not harm them.

Khrushchev era
In September 1953, six months after Stalin's death, Kosygin was appointed USSR Minister for Industrial Goods, and in December he was reinstated as a Deputy Chairman of the Council of Ministers, under Malenkov, Stalin's immediate successor, but lost that position in December 1956, during Khrushchev's ascendancy, when he was appointed Deputy Chairman of the State Economic Commission. When the power struggle between Khrushchev and the so-called 'Anti-Party Group came to a head in 1957, Kosygin backed Khrushchev because, as he said later, if Malenkov and his allies had won "blood would have flowed again", but the French journalist Michel Tatu, a close observer who based in Moscow at the time, concluded that "Kosygin did not owe anything to Khrushchev" and that out of the post-1957 leadership "was visibly the least willing to praise the First Secretary", and that Khrushchev was "somewhat reluctant" to promote Kosygin.

However, despite Khrushchev's reluctance, Kosygin's career made a steady recovery. In June 1957, he was again appointed a Deputy Chairman of the Council of Ministers (for the third time), and a candidate member of the Presidium Central Committee (the renamed Politburo). In March 1959, he was made Chairman of Gosplan, and on 4 May 1960, he was promoted First deputy Chairman of the Council of Ministers, and a full member of the Presidium.

As First Deputy Premier Kosygin travelled abroad, mostly on trade missions, to countries such as North Korea, India, Argentina and Italy. Since 1959 Kosygin headed Soviet mission to the ComEcon. Later, in the aftermath of the Cuban Missile Crisis, Kosygin was the Soviet spokesman for improved relations between the Soviet Union and the United States. According to Michel Tatu, in 1960–62, Kosygin was one of the 'big four', with Khrushchev, Frol Kozlov and Leonid Brezhnev, who would be present in the Kremlin to greet visiting leaders of East European communist parties, implying, but in November 1962, after Khrushchev complained about the management of Gosplan, and opposed Kosygin's plans for economic reform, he was removed from the inner leadership.

Premiership

Struggle for power with Brezhnev

When Khrushchev was removed from power in October 1964, Kosygin replaced him as Premier in a collective leadership that included Leonid Brezhnev as general secretary and Nikolai Podgorny who ultimately became Chairman of the Presidium. Overall, the new Politburo adopted a more conservative outlook than that under Khrushchev's rule.

Kosygin, Podgorny and Andrei Kirilenko were the most reformist members, Brezhnev and Arvīds Pelše belonged to the moderate faction while Mikhail Suslov retained his leadership of the party's Stalinist wing.

In October 1964, at a ceremony in honour of Soviet cosmonauts, Brezhnev called for the strengthening of the Party apparatus. This speech was only the beginning of a large campaign directed against Kosygin. Several newspapers, such as Pravda and Kommunist, criticized the work of the Council of Ministers, and indirectly Kosygin, its chairman, for planning the economy in an unrealistic fashion, and used the highly aggressive rhetoric previously used to condemn Khrushchev against Kosygin.

Brezhnev was able to criticize Kosygin by contrasting him with Vladimir Lenin, who - Brezhnev claimed - had been more interested in improving the conditions of Soviet agriculture than improving the quality of light industrial goods. Kosygin's support for producing more consumer goods was also criticized by Brezhnev, and his supporters, most notably Konstantin Chernenko, for being a return to quasi First World policies. At the 23rd Party Congress, Kosygin's position was weakened when Brezhnev's supporters were able to increase expenditure on defense and agriculture. However, Brezhnev did not have a majority in the Politburo, and could count on only four votes. In the Politburo Kosygin could count on Kiril Mazurov's vote, and when Kosygin and Podgorny were not bickering with each other, they actually had a majority in the Politburo over Brezhnev. Unfortunately for Kosygin this was not often the case, and Kosygin and Podgorny were constantly disagreeing on policy.

Early during Kosygin's tenure, the Brezhnev–Kosygin attempt to create stability was failing on various fronts. From 1969 to 1970, discontent within the Soviet leadership had grown to such an extent that some started to doubt both former and current Soviet policies. Examples include the handling of the Prague Spring and the later Soviet invasion of Czechoslovakia (which Kosygin initially resisted), the decline in agriculture production, the Sino–Soviet border conflict (he advocated restraint), the Vietnam War, and the Soviet–American talks on the limitation of strategic missiles. Two summit conferences between the US and the USSR were held: the Warsaw Pact Summit Conference and the Moscow Summit Conference; both failed to gain support for Soviet policies.

By 1970, these differences had not been resolved, and Brezhnev postponed the 24th Party Congress and the Ninth Five-Year Plan (1971–1975). The delay in resolving these issues led to rumors circulating in Soviet society that Kosygin, or even Brezhnev, would lose their posts to Podgorny. By March 1971, it became apparent that Brezhnev was the leader of the country, with Kosygin as the spokesman of the five-year plan and Podgorny's position within the collective leadership strengthened.

Foreign policy

Early on in his tenure, Kosygin challenged Brezhnev's right as general secretary to represent the country abroad, a function Kosygin believed should fall into the hands of the head of government, as was common in non-communist countries. This was actually implemented for a short period, which led Henry A. Kissinger to believe that Kosygin was the leader of the Soviet Union. Kosygin, who had been the chief negotiator with the First World during the 1960s, was hardly to be seen outside the Second World after Brezhnev consolidated his position within the Politburo, but also due to Foreign Minister Andrei Gromyko's dislike of Kosygin meddling into his own ministerial affairs.

The Six-Day War in the Middle East had the effect of increasing Soviet–American cooperation; to improve relations even further, the United States Government invited Kosygin to a summit with Lyndon B. Johnson, the President of the United States, following his speech to the United Nations. At the summit, which became known as the Glassboro Summit Conference, Johnson and Kosygin failed to reach agreement on limiting anti-ballistic missile systems, but the summit's friendly and even open atmosphere was referred to as the "Spirit of Glassboro". Relations between the two countries improved further when the 1970 Moscow Treaty was signed on 12 August 1970 by Kosygin and Gromyko and Willy Brandt and Walter Scheel who represented West Germany. In 1971, Kosygin gave an extensive interview to the American delegation that included David Rockefeller, presenting his views on US-Soviet relations, environmental protection, arms control and other issues. 
 
Kosygin developed a close friendly relationship with the President of Finland Urho Kekkonen, which helped the USSR to maintain active mutual trade with Finland and to keep it away from Cold War confrontation.

In 1972, Kosygin signed a Treaty of Friendship and Cooperation with the government of Iraq, building on strong Soviet ties to the Iraqi Arab Socialist Ba'ath Party and previous close relations with Iraqi leader Abd al-Karim Qasim.

Kosygin protected János Kádár's economic reforms and his position as leader of the Hungarian People's Republic from intervention by the Soviet leadership. Polish leader Władysław Gomułka, who was removed from all of his posts in 1970, was succeeded by Edward Gierek who tried to revitalize the economy of the People's Republic of Poland by borrowing money from the First World. The Soviet leadership approved both countries' respective economic experiments, since it was trying to reduce its large Eastern Bloc subsidy programme in the form of cheap oil and gas exports. During the discussions within the Soviet leadership of a possible Soviet invasion of Czechoslovakia Kosygin reminded leaders of the consequences of the Soviet suppression of the 1956 Hungarian revolution. Kosygin's stance became more aggressive later on when he understood that the reforms in Czechoslovakia could be turned against his 1965 Soviet economic reform.

Kosygin acted as a mediator between India and Pakistan in 1966, and got both nations to sign the Tashkent Declaration. Kosygin became the chief spokesman on the issue of arms control. In retrospect, many of Kosygin's colleagues felt he carried out his work "stoically", but lacked "enthusiasm", and therefore never developed a real taste for international politics.

The Sino–Soviet split chagrined Kosygin a great deal, and for a while he refused to accept its irrevocability; he briefly visited Beijing in 1969 due to increased tension between the USSR and Maoist China. Kosygin said, in a close-knit circle, that "We are communists and they are communists. It is hard to believe we will not be able to reach an agreement if we met face to face". His view on China changed however, and according to Harold Wilson, former Prime Minister of the United Kingdom, Kosygin viewed China as an "organized military dictatorship" whose intended goal was to enslave "Vietnam and the whole of Asia".

During an official visit by an Afghan delegation, Kosygin and Andrei Kirilenko criticized Afghan leaders Nur Muhammad Taraki and Hafizullah Amin for Stalinist-like repressionist behaviour. He promised to send more economic and military aid, but rejected any proposal regarding a possible Soviet intervention, as an intervention in Afghanistan would strain the USSR's foreign relations with the First World according to Kosygin, most notably West Germany. However, in a closed meeting, without Kosygin, who strongly opposed any kind of military intervention, the Politburo unanimously supported a Soviet intervention.

Economic policy

Five-Year Plans

The Eighth Five-Year Plan (1966–1970) is considered to be one of the most successful periods for the Soviet economy and the most successful when it comes to consumer production (see The "Kosygin" reform). It became known as the "golden era". The 23rd Party Congress and the Ninth Five-Year Plan (1971–1975) had been postponed by Brezhnev due to a power struggle within the Soviet leadership. At the 23rd Party Congress Kosygin promised that the Ninth Five-Year Plan would increase the supply of food, clothing and other household appliances up to 50 percent. The plan envisaged a massive increase in the Soviet standard of living, with Kosygin proclaiming a growth of 40 percent for the population's cash income in his speech to the congress.

The Tenth Five-Year Plan (1976–1981) was referred to by Kosygin as the "plan of quality". Brezhnev rejected Kosygin's bid for producing more consumer goods during the Tenth Five-Year Plan. As a result, the total volume of consumer goods in industrial production only stood at 26 percent. Kosygin's son-in-law notes that Kosygin was furious with the decision, and proclaimed increased defence expenditure would become the Soviet Union's "complete ruin". The plan was less ambitious than its predecessors, with targets of national industrial growth no higher than what the rest of the world had already achieved. Soviet agriculture would receive a share investment of 34 percent, a share much larger than its proportional contribution to the Soviet economy, as it accounted for only 3 percent of the Soviet GDP.

The "Kosygin" reform

Like Khrushchev, Kosygin tried to reform the command economy within a socialist framework. In 1965 Kosygin initiated an economic reform widely referred to as the "Kosygin reform". Kosygin sought to make Soviet industry more efficient by including some market measures common in the First World such as profit making for instance; he also tried to increase quantity of production, increase incentives for managers and workers, and freeing managers from centralized state bureaucracy. The reform had been proposed to Khrushchev in 1964, who evidently liked it and took some preliminary steps to implement it. Brezhnev allowed the reform to proceed because the Soviet economy was entering a period of low growth. In its testing phase, the reform was applied to 336 enterprises in light industry.

The reform was influenced by the works of Soviet economist Evsei Liberman. Kosygin overestimated the ability of the Soviet administrative machine to develop the economy, which led to "corrections" to some of Liberman's more controversial beliefs about decentralization. According to critics, Kosygin's changes to Liberman's original vision caused the reform to fail.

Kosygin believed that decentralization, semi-public companies, and cooperatives were keys to catching up to the First World's contemporary level of economic growth. His reform sought a gradual change from a "state-administered economy" to an economy in which "the state restricts itself to guiding enterprises". The reform was implemented, but showed several malfunctions and inconsistencies early on.

Results
The salary for Soviet citizens increased abruptly by almost 2.5 times during the plan. Real wages in 1980 amounted to 232.7 rubles, compared to 166.3 rubles before the 1965 Soviet economic reform and the Eighth Five-Year Plan. The first period, 1960–1964, was characterized by low growth, while the second period, 1965–1981, had a stronger growth rate. The second period vividly demonstrated the success of the Kosygin reform, with the average annual growth in retail turnover being 11.2 billion rubles, 1.8 times higher than in the first period and 1.2 times higher than the third period (1981–1985). Consumption of goods and daily demand also increased. The consumption of home appliances greatly increased. Refrigerators increased from a low of 109,000 in 1964 to 440,000 units by 1973; consumption declined during the reversal of the reform. Car production increased, and would continue to do so until the late 1980s. The Soviet leadership, under pressure, sought to provide more attractive goods for Soviet consumers.

The removal of Khrushchev in 1964 signalled the end of his "housing revolution". Housing construction declined between 1960 and 1964 to an average of 1.63 million square metres. Following this sudden decrease, housing construction increased sharply between 1965 and 1966, but dropped again, and then steadily grew (the average annual growth rate was 4.26 million square metres). This came largely at the expense of businesses. While the housing shortage was never fully resolved, and still remains a problem in present-day Russia, the reform overcame the negative trend and renewed the growth of housing construction.

Cancellation and aftermath
Growing hostility towards reform, the initial poor results, and Kosygin's reformist stance, led to a popular backlash against him. Kosygin lost most of the privileges he had enjoyed before the reform, but Brezhnev was never able to remove him from the office of Chairman of the Council of Ministers, despite his weakened position. In the aftermath of his failed reform, Kosygin spent the rest of his life improving the economic administration through the modification of targets; he implemented various programmes to improve food security and ensure the future intensification of production. There is no proof to back up the claim that the reform itself contributed to the high growth seen in the late-1960s, or that its cancellation had anything to do with the stagnating growth of the economy which began in the 1970s.

1973 and 1979 reforms

Kosygin initiated another economic reform in 1973 with the intentions of weakening the central Ministries and giving more powers to the regional authorities in republican and local-levels. The reform's failure to meet Kosygin's goal led to its cancellation. However, the reform succeeded in creating associations, an organization representing various enterprises. The last significant reform undertaken by the pre-perestroika leadership was initiated by Kosygin's fifth government in a joint decision of the Central Committee and the Council of Ministers. The "Improving planning and reinforcing the effects of the economic mechanism on raising the effectiveness in production and improving the quality of work", more commonly known as the 1979 reform. The reform, in contrast to the 1965 reform, was intended to increase the central government's economic involvement by enhancing the duties and responsibilities of the ministries. Due to Kosygin's resignation in 1980, and because of Nikolai Tikhonov's conservative approach to economics, very little of the reform was actually implemented.

Later life and resignation

By the early to mid-1970s Brezhnev had established a strong enough power base to effectively become leader. According to historian Ilya Zemtsov, the author of Chernenko: The Last Bolshevik: The Soviet Union on the Eve of Perestroika, Kosygin "began to lose power" with the 24th Party Congress in 1971 which for the first time publicized the formula 'the Politburo led by Brezhnev'". Along with weakening Kosygin's position, Brezhnev moved to strengthen the Party's hold on the Government apparatus, weakening Kosygin's position further. Historian Robert Wesson, the author of Lenin's Legacy: The Story of the CPSU, notes that Kosygin's economic report to the 25th Party Congress "pointed even more clearly to the end of struggle" between Brezhnev and Kosygin. Kosygin was further pushed aside when Brezhnev published his memoirs, which stated that Brezhnev, not Kosygin, was in charge of all major economic decisions. To make matters worse for Kosygin, Brezhnev blocked any future talks on economic reform within the party and government apparatus, and information regarding the reform of 1965 was suppressed.

Brezhnev consolidated his own position over the Government Apparatus by strengthening Podgorny's position as Chairman of the Presidium of the Supreme Soviet, literally head of state, by giving the office some of the functions of the Premier. The 1977 Soviet Constitution strengthened Podgorny's control of the Council of Ministers, by giving the post of head of state some executive powers. In fact, because of the 1977 Soviet Constitution, the Council of Ministers became subordinate to the Presidium of the Supreme Soviet. When Podgorny was replaced as head of state in 1977 by Brezhnev, Kosygin's role in day-to-day management of government activities was lessened drastically, through Brezhnev's new-found post. Rumours started circulating within the top circles, and on the streets, that Kosygin would retire due to bad health.

Brezhnev's consolidation of power weakened Kosygin's influence and prestige within the Politburo. Kosygin's position was gradually weakened during the 1970s and he was frequently hospitalized. On several occasions Kiril Mazurov, the First Deputy chairman of the Council of Ministers, had to act on his behalf. Kosygin suffered his first heart attack in 1976. After this incident, it is said that Kosygin changed from having a vibrant personality to being tired and fed up; he, according to people close to him, seemed to have lost the will to continue his work. He twice filed a letter of resignation between 1976 and 1980, but was turned down on both occasions. During Kosygin's sick leave, Brezhnev appointed Nikolai Tikhonov to the post of First Deputy Chairman of the Council of Ministers. Tikhonov, as with Brezhnev, was a conservative, and through his post as First Deputy chairman Tikhonov was able to reduce Kosygin to a standby role. At a Central Committee plenum in June 1980, the Soviet economic development plan was outlined by Tikhonov, not Kosygin. The powers of the Premier diminished to the point where Kosygin was forced to discuss all decisions made by the Council of Ministers with Brezhnev.

Death 

Kosygin was hospitalized in October 1980; during his stay he wrote a brief letter of resignation; the following day he was deprived of all government protection, communication, and luxury goods he had earned during his political life. Kosygin died on 18 December 1980 in Moscow, none of his Politburo colleagues, former aides, or security guards visited him. At the end of his life, Kosygin feared the complete failure of the Eleventh Five-Year Plan (1981–1985), saying that the sitting leadership was reluctant to reform the stagnant Soviet economy. His funeral was postponed for three days, as Kosygin died on the eve of Brezhnev's birthday, and the day of Stalin's. Kosygin was praised by Brezhnev as an individual who "laboured selflessly for the good of the Soviet state". A state funeral was conducted and Kosygin was honoured by his peers; Brezhnev, Yuri Andropov, and Tikhonov laid an urn containing his ashes at the Kremlin Wall Necropolis.

Personality
Compared to other Soviet officials, Kosygin stood out as a pragmatic and relatively independent leader. In a description given by an anonymous high-ranking GRU official, Kosygin is described as "a lonely and somewhat tragic figure" who "understood our faults and shortcomings of our situation in general and those in our Middle East policy in particular, but, being a highly restrained man, he preferred to be cautious." An anonymous former co-worker of Kosygin said "He always had an opinion of his own, and defended it. He was a very alert man, and performed brilliantly during negotiations. He was able to cope quickly with the material that was totally new to him. I have never seen people of that calibre afterwards."

Canadian Prime Minister Pierre Trudeau said Kosygin was like "Khrushchev without the rough edges, a fatherly man who was the forerunner of Mikhail Gorbachev". He noted that Kosygin was willing to discuss issues so long as the Soviet position was not tackled head-on. Former United States Secretary of State Henry A. Kissinger said that Kosygin was devoted, nearly fanatically, to his work. Kosygin was viewed by Western diplomats as a pragmatist "with a glacial exterior who was orthodox if not rigid". Andrei Sakharov, a Soviet dissident, believed Kosygin to be "the most intelligent and toughest man in the Politburo". Singapore Prime Minister Lee Kuan Yew remembered Kosygin as "very quiet-spoken, but very determined, mind of great ability and application". David Rockefeller admited that Soviet Prime Minister Kosygin was a talented manager doing miracles in ruling the clumsy Soviet economy.

Legacy

Historical assessments
Kosygin would prove to be a very competent administrator, with the Soviet standard of living rising considerably due to his moderately reformist policy. Kosygin's moderate 1965 reform, as with Nikita Khrushchev's thaw, radicalized the Soviet reform movement. While Leonid Brezhnev was content to maintain the centralized structure of the Soviet planned economy, Kosygin attempted to revitalize the ailing economic system by decentralising management. Following Brezhnev's death in 1982, the reform movement was split between Yuri Andropov's path of discipline and control and Gorbachev's liberalization of all aspects of public life.

Chernenko: The Last Bolshevik: The Soviet Union on the Eve of Perestroika author Ilya Zemtsov describes Kosygin as "determined and intelligent, an outstanding administrator" and claims he distinguished himself from the other members of the Soviet leadership with his "extraordinary capacity for work". Historians Moshe Lewin and Gregory Elliott, the authors of The Soviet Century, describe him as a "phenomenal administrator". "His strength", David Law writes, was "his exceptional capability as an administrator". According to Law Kosygin proved himself to be a "competent politician" also. Historians Evan Mawdsley and Stephen White claim that Brezhnev was unable to remove Kosygin because his removal would mean the loss of his last "capable administrator". In their book, The Unknown Stalin, Roy Medvedev and Zhores Medvedev called Kosygin an "outstanding organizer", and the "new Voznesensky". Historian Archie Brown, the author The Rise & Fall of Communism, believes the 1965 Soviet economic reform to have been too "modest", and claimed that Kosygin "was too much a product of the Soviet ministerial system, as it evolved under Stalin, to become a radical economic reformer". However, Brown does believe that Kosygin was "an able administrator". Gvishiani, a Russian historian, concluded that "Kosygin survived both Stalin and Khrushchev, but did not manage to survive Brezhnev."

Kosygin was viewed with sympathy by the Soviet people, and is still presently viewed as an important figure in both Russian and Soviet history. Because of Kosygin's popularity among the Soviet people, Brezhnev developed a "strong jealousy" for Kosygin, according to Nikolai Egorychev. Mikhail Smirtyukov, the former Executive Officer of the Council of Ministers, recalled that Kosygin refused to go drinking with Brezhnev, a move which annoyed Brezhnev gravely. Nikolai Ryzhkov, the last Chairman of the Council of Ministers, in a speech to the Supreme Soviet of the Soviet Union in 1987 referred to the "sad experiences of the 1965 reform", and claimed that everything went from bad to worse following the reform's cancellation.

Honours
During his lifetime, Kosygin received seven Orders and two Awards from the Soviet state. He was awarded two Hero of Socialist Labour (USSR); one being on his 60th birthday by the Presidium of the Supreme Soviet in 1964, on this occasion he was also awarded an Order of Lenin and a Hammer and Sickle Gold Medal. On 20 February 1974, to commemorate his 70th birthday, the Presidium of the Supreme Soviet awarded him another Order of Lenin and his second Hammer and Sickle Gold Medal. In total, Kosygin was awarded six Orders of Lenin by the Soviet state, and one Order of the October Revolution and one Order of the Red Banner of Labour. During a state visit to Peru in the 1970s with Leonid Brezhnev and Andrei Gromyko, all three were awarded the Grand Cross of the Order of the Sun by President Francisco Morales Bermúdez. The Moscow State Textile University was named in his honour in 1981, in 1982 a bust to honour Kosygin was placed in Leningrad, present day Saint Petersburg. In 2006 the Russian Government renamed a street after him.

Foreign honours
 Bangladesh Liberation War Honour (Bangladesh Muktijuddho Sanmanona)

References

Sources

External links
 

1904 births
1980 deaths
Politicians from Saint Petersburg
Heads of government of the Russian Soviet Federative Socialist Republic
Central Committee of the Communist Party of the Soviet Union members
Heads of government of the Soviet Union
Heroes of Socialist Labour
Burials at the Kremlin Wall Necropolis
Politburo of the Central Committee of the Communist Party of the Soviet Union members
Soviet engineers
Soviet Ministers of Finance
World War II political leaders
People's commissars and ministers of the Soviet Union
Recipients of the Order of Lenin
Grand Crosses of the Order of the Sun of Peru
Soviet reformers